Biodun Shobanjo is the Chairman of Troyka.

Early life
Shobanjo lost his father at the age of 15 years, which ushered the turning point in his life and a ‘half scholarship.

References

Living people
Businesspeople in advertising
20th-century Nigerian businesspeople
21st-century Nigerian businesspeople
1944 births
People from Kwara State